The Ninth All-Ukrainian Congress of Soviets was a congress of  Soviets (councils) of workers, peasants, Red-army-men deputies that took place in Kharkiv on May 3 - 10, 1925.

Composition
There were 838 delegates. Among the delegates 624 were Communists.

Agenda
 Report of government of the Soviet Union
 Report of government of the Ukrainian SSR
 About strengthening and upturn of agriculture
 Report about agriculture and land use
 About situation and prospective of development of industry in Ukraine
 About Red Army
 About transitioning to a three-tier administrative system

Decisions
The resolution of the congress set following tasks 
 further expansion of socialist construction in the republic
 improving of the state apparatus
 strengthening the union of workers and peasants
 involving in socialist construction the working intelligentsia
 outlining measures in strengthening of the Red Army and Fleet
 amended the Constitution of the Ukrainian SSR in connection with the formation of the Soviet Union as well as the Moldavian ASSR within the Ukrainian SSR

The congress approved the Constitution of the Moldavian ASSR. It elected the All-Ukrainian Central Executive Committee consisting of 300 members and 91 candidates as well as representatives of the Ukrainian SSR to the Council of Nationalities of the Central Executive Committee of the Soviet Union.

External links
Brazhnikov, V. Ninth All-Ukrainian Congress of Soviets. Ukrainian Soviet Encyclopedia

9
Political history of Ukraine
1925 in Ukraine
History of Kharkiv
1925 in politics
Communism in Ukraine
1925 conferences